The Journal of Nutrition, Health and Aging is a monthly peer-reviewed medical journal covering nutrition science as it relates to gerontology. It was established in 1997 and is published by Springer Science+Business Media. The editor-in-chief is John Morley. According to the Journal Citation Reports, the journal has a 2014 impact factor of 2.996.

References

External links

Gerontology journals
Publications established in 1997
Springer Science+Business Media academic journals
Monthly journals
English-language journals
Nutrition and dietetics journals